"Hell Raisin' Good Time" is a song recorded by Canadian country music artist Tim Hicks. It was released in May 2013 as the second single from his debut album, Throw Down. It peaked at number 59 on the Canadian Hot 100 in September 2013.

Critical reception
In his review of Hicks' EP, Henry Lees of Top Country wrote that the song "turns things up another few notches with some guitar growl and the best chorus hook of the bunch."

Music video
The music video premiered on May 31, 2013.

Chart performance
"Hell Raisin' Good Time" debuted at number 93 on the Canadian Hot 100 for the week of June 29, 2013.

Certifications

References 

2013 songs
2013 singles
Tim Hicks songs
Open Road Recordings singles
Songs written by Neil Sanderson
Songs written by Tim Hicks